When a foreign place name, or toponym, occurs in Chinese text, the problem arises of spelling it in Chinese characters, given the limited phonetics and restrictive phonology of Mandarin Chinese (making it very difficult to transcribe loanwords), and the possible meaning of those characters when treated as Chinese words. For example:
 "London Heathrow Airport" is usually rendered in Chinese characters as 伦敦希斯路机场 (Lúndūn Xīsīlù Jīchǎng), with the English pronunciation of 'London' being fairly accurate, and of 'Heathrow' being less accurate: in Chinese the translation of each character literally means "kinship, honest" (for London, 伦敦), "hope, given/this, road" (for Heathrow, 希斯路), "aircraft, field" (机场), with the last syllable of "Heathrow" rendered as "lu" although the more accurate "lo" and "lou" are known Chinese words. The reason for this strange transcription for "Heathrow" is because the name of the airport was introduced to the Chinese language through Cantonese, in which the loanword is pronounced Hei1 Si1 Lo4, which is actually more accurate to the English pronunciation of the name. However, when this word was adopted into Mandarin, the Chinese characters to write "Heathrow" were used without any regards to pronunciation, in which the Mandarin and Cantonese pronunciations of the same Chinese character can often be drastically different from one another.

Sometimes, the endonym or the English exonym of a place can be literally translated in Chinese characters, such as "Salt Lake City" or the "Dead Sea", which are translated into Chinese as 盐湖城 (Yánhú Chéng) and 死海 (Sǐhǎi), which mean "salt-lake-city" and "dead-sea" respectively.

More often than not, however, characters are chosen simply because their syllables sound somewhat similar to the syllables of the endonym or the English exonym, regardless of the meaning of the individual characters. Examples include Dublin and Yemen, which are written in Chinese as 都柏林 (Dūbólín, which literally translates as "all-cypress-forest") and 也门 (Yěmén, which literally translates as "also-door") respectively. In both Chinese exonyms, the connection between the meanings of the Chinese characters and their respective places is not particularly obvious, so it is safe to assume these exonyms are transcriptions. Historically, the characters chosen to represent the sounds have sometimes been chosen to be intended as derogatory (see graphic pejoratives in written Chinese), although many of these have been replaced with homophones with neutral or positive connotations.

There are other exonyms that are a combination of translation and transcription (meaning and sound) of the endonym. For example, New Zealand is written as 新西兰 (Xīnxīlán), in which the first character 新 (xīn) literally means "new" and the final two characters 西兰 (Xīlán) is a transcription of "Zealand". Likewise, America is written as 美国 (Měiguó), which is a combination of 美 (měi), one of the characters in another exonym 阿美利哥 (Āměilìgē), and 国 (guó), the translation for the word "country". The full name of the United States in Chinese, “美利坚合众国” (Meilijianhezhongguo), which is very rarely used in China, roughly translates to the "United States of America" and is not an exonym, as the official Chinese word for the nation of the United States is different for the Chinese word for the continent of America. Acronyms including the character 国 (guó) is common among exonyms.

Names of foreign nations are sometimes shortened to their first character when used in compounds. For example, the name for Russia in Chinese is 俄罗斯 (Éluósī), but the name of the Russian language is 俄语 (Éyǔ), anything Russian-style is 俄式 (Éshì), and the Russian military is 俄军 (Éjūn).

However, some Chinese exonyms exist which are not immediately obvious because they are neither translations nor transcriptions, such as 旧金山 (Jiùjīnshān, which literally means "Old Gold Mountain") and 新金山 (Xīnjīnshān, which literally means "New Gold Mountain") for San Francisco and Melbourne respectively. These exonyms exist because they have a special history among Chinese people worldwide for one reason or another.

For Japanese, Korean, or Vietnamese names, the Chinese exonym is often the Chinese pronunciation of the Korean hanja, Japanese kanji, or ancient Vietnamese Chữ Nôm writing of the toponym. In some cases, especially in Japan, the Chinese pronunciation may be completely unlike the native-language pronunciation.

However, if the country's or city's endonym is not internationally well-known, Chinese will often transcribe the endoynym or English name into Chinese characters.

Countries had been founded or had gained independence after 1949 (the year Kuomintang had exiled to Taiwan after losing to the Communist Party) often have different exonyms used in mainland China (PRC) and Taiwan (ROC) due to differences in official standards resulting from the split in government. Exonyms used in mainland China are written in simplified Chinese on this page, and exonyms used in Taiwan are written in traditional Chinese. The exception to this are exonyms for Japanese and Korean place names, which will be written in traditional Chinese.

The exonyms below are all in Mandarin Chinese.

Afghanistan

Albania

Algeria

Andorra

Angola

Antigua and Barbuda

Argentina

Armenia

Australia

Austria

Azerbaijan

Bahamas

Bahrain

Bangladesh

Belarus

Bhutan

Brazil

Brunei

Bulgaria

Burundi

Cambodia

Canada

Egypt

Ethiopia

France

Germany

Haiti

Iceland 
The Chinese exonym is a literal translation of the endonym.

India

Indonesia

Iraq

Ireland

Israel 
Placenames in Israel will include places in Palestinian territories.

Japan

Jordan

Laos

Mexico

Myanmar

Nepal

New Zealand

North Korea 
In Chinese, the country can be referred to as North Korea, but it is usually referred to just by the cognate for the endonym, Choson (조선).

Philippines

Poland

Portugal

Russia

Saudi Arabia

South Korea 
In Chinese, the country is not usually referred to as South Korea, but by the cognate for the endonym, Hanguk (한국).

Sri Lanka

Syria

Turkey

Thailand

Ukraine

United Kingdom

United States

Uzbekistan

Vietnam

Yemen

International bodies of water

International landmarks and regions

See also

References

 
Lists of exonyms
History of the foreign relations of China